Welland is an unincorporated community in LaSalle and Lee counties in the U.S. state of Illinois. The community is located in Mendota Township in LaSalle County and Brooklyn Township in Lee County.

References

Unincorporated communities in LaSalle County, Illinois
Unincorporated communities in Lee County, Illinois
Unincorporated communities in Illinois